Big Boiling Spring or Big Boiling Springs, Kentucky, was a former name of:

 Russell Springs, Kentucky
 Russellville, Kentucky